Families International is the holding company for the Alliance for Children and Families, Ways to Work, FEI Behavioral Health, and the United Neighborhood Centers of America. Each organization is based in Milwaukee, Wisconsin.

Former president and CEO, Peter Goldberg, unexpectedly died.

Susan Dreyfus has been the president and CEO since January 2012.

External links
Alliance for Children and Families
FEI Behavioral Health
Ways to Work
United Neighborhood Centers of America

Organizations based in Milwaukee